Marguerite is a 2017 Canadian short drama film, written and directed by Marianne Farley. The film stars Béatrice Picard and Sandrine Bisson.

The film premiered at the Taipei Golden Horse Film Festival on 12 November 2017. In 2018, it screened at both LGBT and general film festivals. It was one of 12 short films selected for screening on Ici TOU.TV in conjunction with the 2018 Rendez-vous Québec Cinéma film festival.

Plot
An elderly woman confronts her own long-repressed romantic feelings for another woman after learning that her home care nurse is a lesbian.

Cast
 Béatrice Picard as Marguerite
 Sandrine Bisson as Rachel

Awards
Marguerite won numerous film festival awards, including Best Actress (International) for Béatrice Picard at Short Shorts Film Festival & Asia (Japan), Best Short Film at QFilms Long Beach, Best Short Film at TWIST: Seattle Queer Film Festival, Best Short Film Female at FilmOut San Diego, Best Women's Short Audience Award at Wicked Queer (Boston), and the Live Action Short Grand Prize at Academy Award-qualifying Rhode Island International Film Festival. It received an Oscar nomination for Best Live Action Short Film at the 91st Academy Awards.

See also
List of LGBT-related films directed by women

References

External links
  Marguerite at H264 Distribution
 
 

2017 films
2017 LGBT-related films
Canadian LGBT-related short films
Lesbian-related films
LGBT-related drama films
Quebec films
Films shot in Quebec
2017 drama films
2017 short films
French-language Canadian films
Canadian drama short films
2010s Canadian films